Scott Lagasse Sr. (pronounced LAG-a-say) (born February 20, 1959) is a former race car driver. He has competed in multiple series, most notably the NASCAR Winston Cup Series.

Racing career

SCCA 
Beginning in 1985, he became the first driver to earn Novice, Regional and National License all in the same season.  More impressive was winning the SCCA National Championship in his very first season of racing. Scott went on the following season  to capture the SCCA National Championship again as well as winning an SCCA PRO Title.

From there Scott drove for various manufacturers including Chevrolet, Lotus and Pontiac where he compiled many wins. Scott's Sports Car tenure netted 3 National Titles, multiple International records as well as setting several world record speeds before moving on to stock car racing.

Craftsman Truck Series 
In 1995, Lagasse signed to drive the No. 24 Chevrolet Silverado for BSR Racing in the Craftsman Truck Series The first year team was owned by Billy Hess and Butch Stevens with sponsorship from DuPont. Scott posted seven top-ten finishes and finished ninth in points. Despite this, Dupont chose not to return and the program would move in house with Quaker State and Jack Sprague at the wheel. In 1996, Lagasse ran four races for Kevin Duran and did not record a top ten finish. His last attempt at a Truck race in 1998, for Marty Walsh, but failed to qualify.

Busch Series 
He made his NASCAR debut in 1993 at Watkins Glen, starting 15th and finishing 31st after his No. 75 Oldsmobile suffered transmission failure. In 1994, substituting for Bobby Dotter (broken shoulder) in a race at Watkins Glen, Scott replaced Dotter after the first lap narrowly getting out of the pits ahead of leader Terry Labonte and ran through the field to finish a remarkable 2nd. In 1997, Lagasse ran nine races for Allen Bloom and did not record a top twenty finish. In 1998, Lagasse ran two races and in 1999 he ran his final one, driving for Ed Rensi, finishing 14th at Watkins Glen.

Winston Cup 
Lagasse ran two races in the series, the 1993 and 1994 Watkins Glen races. His best finish was 13th in 1993.

Other racing 
Lagasse has also competed in IMSA (include Rolex 24 at Daytona), ARCA, and ASA.

His son, Scott Lagasse Jr., also competes in NASCAR, as well as dirt late models around the southeast.

Motorsports career results

SCCA National Championship Runoffs

NASCAR
(key) (Bold – Pole position awarded by qualifying time. Italics – Pole position earned by points standings or practice time. * – Most laps led.)

Winston Cup Series

Busch Series

Craftsman Truck Series

 Season still in progress
1 Ineligible for series points

References

External links 

1959 births
American Speed Association drivers
ARCA Menards Series drivers
Living people
NASCAR drivers
People from St. Augustine, Florida
Racing drivers from Florida
Trans-Am Series drivers
SCCA National Championship Runoffs winners
Hendrick Motorsports drivers